Podperaea krylovii is a species of moss in the genus Podperaea. Found in Asia, it was transferred to the genus Podperaea by Zennosuke Iwatsuki and Janice Mildred Glime.

References

Hypnaceae
Plants described in 1984